Varnum may refer to:

 Varnum v. Brien (763 N.W.2d 862), 1 2009 Iowa Supreme Court case
 Varnum Building, a historic commercial and residential building in Lowell, Massachusetts
 Varnum School, a historic former school building in Lowell, Massachusetts
 Varnum's Continentals, a nickname for the 1st Rhode Island Regiment in the American Revolutionary War
 Camp Varnum, a Rhode Island Army National Guard training facility

People with the surname
 Betty Lou Varnum (1931–2021), children's television program personality
 Charles Albert Varnum (1849–1936), US Army officer and Custer's Chief of Scouts at the time of Little Big Horn
 James Mitchell Varnum (1748–1789), Continental Army officer and US statesman 
 James M. Varnum (born 1848) (1848–1907), American lawyer and politician
 John Varnum (1778–1836), US Representative from Massachusetts
 Joseph Bradley Varnum ( 1750–1821), US Representative from Massachusetts and Speaker of the House

See also